Nasos Gerolymos (born 13 December 1995) is a Greek footballer, who  plays for Diagoras in the Football League 2 as a left back.

References

1995 births
Living people
Ethnikos Piraeus F.C. players
Panelefsiniakos F.C. players
Association football defenders
Footballers from Athens
Greek footballers
21st-century Greek people